Alexander Georg Nicolas Schallenberg OMRI (born 20 June 1969) is an Austrian diplomat, jurist, and politician who has served as Minister of Foreign Affairs in the government of Chancellor Karl Nehammer since 2021, previously holding the office from 2019 to 2021. A member of the Austrian People's Party (ÖVP), he held the position in the second government of Sebastian Kurz, before briefly serving as Chancellor of Austria as Kurz's successor from 11 October to 6 December 2021.

A member of the Schallenberg family and a graduate of the College of Europe, Schallenberg was a career diplomat who became a mentor to Kurz when the latter became foreign minister. Kurz appointed him director of strategic foreign policy planning and head of the European department. Schallenberg joined the cabinet as foreign minister in 2019. After Kurz announced his pending resignation on 9 October 2021, Schallenberg was proposed by the ÖVP to replace him as Chancellor of Austria. He was sworn in on 11 October 2021. Schallenberg announced his pending resignation on 2 December 2021, after less than two months in office. His resignation took effect on 6 December; he returned to the position of foreign minister.

Background and family

A member of the comital branch of the Austro-Hungarian Schallenberg family, Schallenberg was born in 1969 in Bern, Switzerland, where his father Wolfgang was Austrian ambassador to Switzerland. His mother is a native of Switzerland, and the daughter of Swiss banker and president of UBS Alfred Schaefer. Schallenberg was raised in India, Spain and France where his father served as ambassador; his father eventually became Secretary-General of the Foreign Ministry. Schallenberg speaks German, French, English and Spanish fluently, and has basic knowledge of Russian. The Genealogisches Handbuch des Adels lists his given names as Alexander Georg Nicolas Christoph Wolfgang Tassilo, though Schallenberg has disputed this and listed Alexander Georg Nicolas as his given names.

His paternal grandfather, Herbert, Count of Schallenberg (1901–1974), was Austrian consul general in Prague, while his paternal grandmother was the daughter of politician Walter Koch, the Saxon and later German ambassador in Prague. He is a 2nd great-grandson of Austro-Hungarian general Karl Kostersitz von Marenhorst. Schallenberg has mainly Swiss ancestry on his mother's side and Austrian, Bohemian, Moravian, Hungarian and Saxon ancestry on his father's side. Alexander Schallenberg's traditional title is Count, the hereditary title his family was conferred in 1666 within the Habsburg Hereditary Lands. He is the first chancellor since Kurt Schuschnigg and Prince Starhemberg to belong to a noble family.

Marriage and children
Schallenberg married French–Belgian European civil servant and fellow graduate of the College of Europe Marie-Isabelle Hénin (born 1969 in Uccle) in Saint-Pierre, France in 1995. She is the daughter of Erik Hénin and noted equestrian and 1960s Parisian socialite Isabelle Le Maresquier, and a granddaughter of the prominent French architect Noël Le Maresquier and Spanish noblewoman Conchita López de Tejada; Isabelle Le Maresquier was a niece of French prime minister Michel Debré. Her family was discussed as an example of French "state nobility" by Pierre Bourdieu.

Alexander and Marie-Isabelle Schallenberg have four children, they later divorced.

Education and early career
From 1989 to 1994, he studied law at the University of Vienna and the University of Paris II Panthéon-Assas. From 1995 to 1996 he earned an LL.M. in European law at the College of Europe in Bruges, Belgium, an institution that aims "to train an elite of young executives for Europe" and whose graduates are said to form a close-knit "Bruges Mafia." Schallenberg was a graduate of the "Walter Hallstein promotion."

In 1997, Schallenberg joined the Austrian diplomatic service. From 2000 to 2005, he worked at the permanent representation of Austria to the European Union in Brussels, where he headed the legal department. In 2006, he became a press spokesman to Foreign Minister Ursula Plassnik, a fellow College of Europe graduate. When Sebastian Kurz became foreign minister, Schallenberg was appointed as director of strategic foreign policy planning in 2013. Originally he was scheduled to become ambassador to India in 2014, but he chose to remain at the foreign ministry to work with the new foreign minister. Schallenberg was widely seen as a mentor to the inexperienced Kurz who knew little of foreign policy, who in turn promoted him to senior posts. In 2016 Schallenberg became head of the European department of the foreign ministry.

Political career

On 3 June 2019, Schallenberg succeeded Karin Kneissl as foreign minister of Austria. He maintained his position as part of the second Kurz cabinet, which was sworn in on 7 January 2020. He stepped down when he became chancellor, but returned to the position following his resignation.

After attending an EU summit at the Europa building in Luxembourg on 12 and 13 October 2020 with Sophie Wilmès, Schallenberg tested positive for COVID-19.

Chancellor

After Kurz announced his pending resignation on 9 October 2021 as a result of the Kurz corruption probe, Schallenberg was proposed by the ÖVP to replace him as chancellor of Austria.

Schallenberg was sworn in as chancellor on 11 October 2021 by President Alexander Van der Bellen. In his first official act, he nominated career diplomat and ambassador to France Michael Linhart to succeed him as foreign minister.

In November 2021, Schallenberg announced that COVID-19 vaccines would be mandatory in Austria from February 2022. It became the first European country to mandate the vaccine.

Schallenberg announced his resignation on 2 December 2021 following Kurz's announcement that he was leaving politics just a few hours prior. As his reason for stepping down, he cited his belief that the chancellor and party leader should be the same person.

Honours
Grand Cross of the Order of Merit of the Principality of Liechtenstein (2019)
Knight Grand Cross of the Order of Merit of the Italian Republic (2020)

Other activities
Since 2020, Schallenberg has been a trustee of the National Fund of the Republic of Austria for Victims of National Socialism.

Explanatory notes

References

External links

 Curriculum Vitae on the ministry's website

 

1969 births
21st-century Austrian politicians
21st-century Chancellors of Austria
College of Europe alumni
Counts of Austria
Foreign ministers of Austria
Knights Grand Cross of the Order of Merit of the Italian Republic
Living people
Paris 2 Panthéon-Assas University alumni
People from Bern
Alexander
University of Vienna alumni